Timothy John Campbell (January 8, 1840 – April 7, 1904) was an American lawyer and politician from New York. He served four terms in the U.S. House of Representatives during the late 19th Century.

Life
Born in County Cavan in Ireland (then a part of the U.K.), he emigrated to New York City.

State legislature 
He was a member of the New York State Assembly (New York Co., 6th D.) in 1868, 1869, 1870, 1871, 1872, 1873, 1875 and 1883.

He was a member of the New York State Senate (6th D.) in 1884 and 1885.

Congress 
He was elected as a Democrat to the 49th United States Congress, to fill the vacancy caused by the resignation of Samuel S. Cox, was re-elected to the 50th, and was elected again to the 52nd and 53rd United States Congresses, holding office from November 3, 1885, to March 3, 1889; and from March 4, 1891, to March 3, 1895.

Campbell earned a touch of immortality of an attributed nature. He is reported to have said to President Grover Cleveland, upon Cleveland's saying he would not support a bill on the grounds that the bill was unconstitutional, "What's the Constitution between friends?"  (Bartlett's Familiar Quotations, 16th ed.)

Death 
Campbell died in New York City on April 7, 1904.

References

Politicians from New York City
Politicians from County Cavan
1840 births
1904 deaths
Irish emigrants to the United States (before 1923)
Democratic Party members of the New York State Assembly
Democratic Party New York (state) state senators
Democratic Party members of the United States House of Representatives from New York (state)
19th-century American politicians
Lawyers from New York City